Liu Sizhi (15 March 1904 – 18 August 1983) was a Chinese biochemist and an academician of the Chinese Academy of Sciences.

Biography 
Liu was born in Xianyou County, Fujian, on 15 March 1904. In 1921, he was admitted to the Great China University, majoring in the Department of Chemistry. In 1925, with the support of his father-in-law, he pursued advanced studies in the United States, first earning a BS degree from the Southwestern University in 1926 and then a Doctorate in Physical Chemistry from the University of Kansas in 1929.

After university, he returned to China and taught at his alma mater, the Great China University. In 1930, he was hired by the Peking Union Medical College (now Peking University Health Science Center), where he successively served as assistant, lecturer, associate professor, and professor (1946). During this period, he also studied at the Institute of Cell Physiology of William Caesar Institute in Germany and the University of Cambridge in the United Kingdom as a part-time student. He joined the Jiusan Society in 1956.

On 18 August 1983, he died of illness in Beijing, aged 79.

Honours and awards 
 1957 Member of the Chinese Academy of Sciences (CAS)

References 

1904 births
1983 deaths
People from Xianyou County
Scientists from Fujian
Chinese biochemists
Southwestern University alumni
University of Kansas alumni
Academic staff of Peking University
Members of the Chinese Academy of Sciences